Lake Sabula is a reservoir located in Sandy Township, Clearfield County, Pennsylvania, United States just below the source of Sandy Lick Creek.

References

Rivers of Pennsylvania
Tributaries of the Allegheny River
Rivers of Clearfield County, Pennsylvania